South Pass (elevation  and ) is a route across the Continental Divide, in the Rocky Mountains in southwestern Wyoming. The Pass lies in southwestern Fremont County, approximately  SSW of Lander.

Though it approaches a mile and a half high, South Pass is the lowest point on the Continental Divide between the Central and Southern Rocky Mountains. The passes furnish a natural crossing point of the Rockies. The historic pass became the route for emigrants on the Oregon, California, and Mormon trails to the West during the 19th century. It was designated as a U.S. National Historic Landmark on January 20, 1961.

History
Though well known to Native Americans, South Pass was first traversed in 1812 by European American explorers who were seeking a safer way to return from the West Coast than they had taken to it.  As a natural crossing point of the Rockies its pioneering was a significant but surprisingly difficult achievement in the westward expansion of the United States. Because the Lewis and Clark Expedition of 1803-1806 was searching for a water route across the Continental Divide it did not learn of South Pass from local peoples. Instead, the expedition followed a northerly route up the Missouri River, crossing the Rockies over difficult passes in the Bitterroot Range between present-day Montana and Idaho.

The first recorded crossing was made on 22 Oct. 1812 by Robert Stuart, and six companions from the Pacific Fur Company of John Jacob Astor.  They were trying to avoid Crow warriors further north, on their return to St. Louis, Missouri from Astoria, Oregon.  A Shoshone had told Stuart of "...a shorter trace to the South than that by which Mr. Hunt had traversed the R. Mountains..." In 1856 Ramsay Crooks, one of the party, wrote a letter describing their journey:

Stuart's "Travel Memorandum" was left with President James Madison, but the War of 1812 preempted western exploration. A translation of his journal was published in an 1821 French journal, but South Pass would have to be rediscovered by later explorers from information provided by Crow Indians.

In 1823 William Henry Ashley's Rocky Mountain Fur Company led to the rediscovery of the pass.  Jedediah Smith's party, part of Ashley's Hundred, made the first crossing traveling east to west in Feb. 1824.  Ashley subsequently established the first Rocky Mountain Rendezvous in 1825.  Ashley sold out to Smith, William Sublette, and David Jackson in 1826, becoming their supplier.

In 1832 Captain Benjamin Bonneville, aided by Michel Cerre and Joseph R. Walker, blazed a wagon road across the pass.  Their caravan of 20 wagons, in place of the usual pack-train, supplied the fur trappers from Fort Bonneville, which they established near the Green River.

In 1834, Nathaniel Jarvis Wyeth led the first Methodist missionaries Jason Lee, Daniel Lee, and Cyrus Shepard across the pass.  They were accompanied by the naturalist John Kirk Townsend, who documented this first use of the Oregon-California Trail, avoiding the Lander Cutoff used by the fur traders.  Wyeth then established Fort Hall on the Snake River and the Lees settled the Willamette Valley.  Robert "Doc" Newell's first child was born at South Pass in June 1835.  Also in 1835, Thomas Fitzpatrick led Protestant missionaries Samuel Parker and Dr. Marcus Whitman across the pass.  In 1836, Fitzpatrick guided the "First White Women to Cross This Pass", Narcissa Whitman and Eliza Hart Spalding, along with and their husbands, plus Miles Goodyear and William Gray. By 1838, four additional American missionary women had crossed the pass, Myra Fairbanks Eells, Mary Richardson Walker, Mary Augusta Dix Gray and Sarah Gilbert White Smith.

The first family of emigrants, the Walkers, crossed the pass in 1840 with the intention of settling in Oregon.  Joel Pickens Walker, and his wife Mary Young Walker, made the journey with their four children.  In 1841, Fitzpatrick led the Bartleson-Bidwell Party across the pass, the first wagon train.

In 1842, John C. Fremont led a United States Army Corps of Topographical Engineers expedition to survey South Pass.  Reaching the pass on 8 Aug. 1842, Fremont wrote, "The ascent had been so gradual, that, with all the intimate knowledge possessed by Carson, who had made the country his home for seventeen years, we were obliged to watch very closely to find the place at which we had reached the culminating point."  In his 1843 expedition, Fremont was able to determine the elevation of the pass at 7,490 feet above sea level. He wrote, "...it may be assumed to be about half-way between the Mississippi and the Pacific ocean, on the common traveling route...the emigrant road to Oregon."

Stephen W. Kearny led the first military expedition to South Pass in 1845.  By 1848, 18,487 Americans had crossed the pass, and over 300,000 by 1860.

Gold had been discovered in the gulches near the pass as early as 1842. However, it was not until 1867, when an ore sample was transported to Salt Lake City, that an influx of miners descended into the region. The gold rush led to the establishment of booming mining communities, such as South Pass City and Atlantic City. The placer gold in the streams was exhausted quickly, however, and by 1870 the miners began leaving the region. In 1884, Emile Granier, a French mining engineer, established a hydraulic mining operation that allowed gold mining to continue. Gold mining was revived in nearby Rock Creek in the 1930s. Additionally, from 1962 through 1983, a U.S. Steel iron ore mine operated in Atlantic City, and the company's Atlantic City Mine Railroad crossed South Pass.

After passage of the Pacific Telegraph Act of 1860, South Pass Station was established in 1861, at Last Crossing on the Sweetwater River.
South Pass was designated a National Historic Landmark in 1961.

Wyoming Highway 28 traverses the modern pass, roughly following the route of the Oregon Trail. Wagon ruts are still clearly visible at numerous sites within a few miles of the highway.

Topography
The pass is a broad open saddle with prairie and sagebrush, allowing a broad and nearly level route between the Atlantic and Pacific watersheds. The Sweetwater River flows past the east side of the pass, and Pacific Creek rises on the west side. Historic South Pass is the lower of the two passes (elevation ), and was the easy crossing point used by emigrants. Wyoming Highway 28 crosses the Continental Divide  to the northwest at elevation , and its crossing is also named South Pass.

See also
 Great Migration of 1843
 Mormon Emigration
 Overland Trail
 Continental Divide of the Americas
 List of passes of the Rocky Mountains
 South Pass City, Wyoming
 South Pass greenstone belt

References

External links

 History and virtual tour of South pass
 "Ramsay Crooks 1856 letter", XMission.com
 South Pass National Historic Landmark, Wyoming State Historic Preservation Office

California Trail
Landforms of Fremont County, Wyoming
Great Divide of North America
Mormon Trail
Mountain passes of Wyoming
National Historic Landmarks in Wyoming
Oregon Trail
Pony Express
Transportation in Fremont County, Wyoming
Natural features on the National Register of Historic Places in Wyoming
National Register of Historic Places in Fremont County, Wyoming
Road transportation infrastructure on the National Register of Historic Places